William O'Connor Morris (26 November 1824, Kilkenny – 3 August 1904) was an Irish county court judge and historian.

Education and career
Morris was educated at Epsom College in Surrey and a school at Laugharne in Wales, before matriculating in 1843 at Oriel College, Oxford. He graduated there in 1848 after a leave of absence of a year and a half in 1846–1847 due to his family's financial difficulties connected with the Great Famine. Three years after leaving Oxford, he entered the King's Inns in Dublin as a law student. He was admitted to Lincoln's Inn in 1852 and was called to the Irish bar in 1854. He became a professor of common and criminal law in the King's Inns in 1862. In 1863 he was appointed Special Commissioner of Irish Fisheries but was compelled to resign due to a differing opinion with Sir Robert Peel.

Morris married in 1858 and through his wife's inheritance became owner of the Gartnamona estate. Morris, an acquaintance of Henry Reeve, contributed articles on history and other subjects to the Edinburgh Review and, less often, to the English Historical Review. He also reviewed books on military history for The Times. As a landlord he was keenly interested in land tenure in Ireland, and the Landlord and Tenant (Ireland) Act 1870 incorporated many of his ideas. He was appointed a county court judge for County Louth in 1872 and after six years was transferred to County Kerry. At his own request he was transferred in 1886 to the county judgeship of the united counties of Sligo and Roscommon and thereafter devoted most of his efforts to literary work.

Personal life
He married Georgiana Kathleen Lindsay on 16 March 1858; the marriage produced five daughters and one son.

Selected publications

 (autobiography)

Arms

References

External links

 

1824 births
1904 deaths
People from County Kilkenny
People educated at Epsom College
Alumni of Oriel College, Oxford
19th-century Irish historians
20th-century Irish historians
19th-century Irish landowners
19th-century Irish judges
20th-century Irish landowners